Keith Cameron Hardie (May 16, 1910 – April 7, 1994) was a member of the Wisconsin State Assembly.

Biography
Hardie was born on May 16, 1910 in Franklin, Jackson County, Wisconsin. Hardie owned a fuel oil company and served on the local school board in Ettrick, Wisconsin. In 1961, he was appointed a United States Marshal. He died on April 7, 1994.

Career
Hardie was a member of the Assembly from 1953 to 1960. He was a Democrat.

References

People from Jackson County, Wisconsin
People from Trempealeau County, Wisconsin
Businesspeople from Wisconsin
1910 births
1994 deaths
United States Marshals
20th-century American businesspeople
20th-century American politicians
Democratic Party members of the Wisconsin State Assembly